Alessandro "Sandro" Iovino (born 26 August 1939) is an Italian actor and voice actor.

Biography
Born in Rome with a career spanning over 50 years, Iovino started out as a television and stage actor in the late 1960s. On stage, he starred in theatre adaptions of William Shakespeare's plays such as Julius Caesar. As a voice actor, Iovino is typically known for dubbing villainous characters, most notably Mr. Burns in the Italian-Language version of The Simpsons.

Other dubbing roles Iovino is known for includes J. Jonah Jameson (portrayed by J.K. Simmons) in the Italian-Language version of the Spider-Man film series and Windom Earle (portrayed by Kenneth Welsh) in the Italian-Language version of Twin Peaks. Among the actors Iovino dubs includes Rutger Hauer, F. Murray Abraham, Terence Stamp, Donald Sutherland, Sam Shepard, Paul Freeman, Steven Berkoff and since the death of Sergio Rossi in 1998, he has dubbed Leslie Nielsen in most of his films.

Dubbing roles

Animation
Farmer Tom Griggs in The Animals of Farthing Wood
Charles Montgomery Burns in The Simpsons and in The Simpsons Movie
Lord Maliss in Happily Ever After
Duke Red in Metropolis
King Colbert in Thumbelina
Hudson in Gargoyles
The Encyclopod in Futurama: Into the Wild Green Yonder
Robert Stephenson in Steamboy
Pops in Johnny Bravo

Live action
Roy Batty in Blade Runner
Windom Earle in Twin Peaks
J. Jonah Jameson in Spider-Man
J. Jonah Jameson in Spider-Man 2
J. Jonah Jameson in Spider-Man 3
General Zod in Superman II
Dick Steele in Spy Hard
President Harris in Scary Movie 3
President Harris in Scary Movie 4
Uncle Albert in Superhero Movie
John Practice in Last Action Hero
Dr. René Belloq in Indiana Jones and the Raiders of the Lost Ark
Warden Rudolph Hazen in The Longest Yard
Francis "Lionel" Delbuchi in Scarecrow
Thomas Perry in Dead Poets Society
Victor Maitland in Beverly Hills Cop
Magistrate Fang in Oliver Twist
Principal Gibbons in Easy A
Duke Scanlon in Christmas with the Kranks
Rex Kramer in Airplane!
Principal Hancock in Forrest Gump
Richard Vernon in The Breakfast Club
William F. Garrison in Black Hawk Down
CIA Superior in Burn After Reading

Video games
Charles Montgomery Burns in The Simpsons Game

References

External links

1939 births
Living people
Male actors from Rome
Italian male voice actors
Italian male television actors
Italian male stage actors
Italian male video game actors
20th-century Italian male actors
21st-century Italian male actors